"In the Navy" is a song by American disco group Village People. It was released as the first single from their fourth studio album, Go West (1979). It was a number one hit in Canada, Flanders, Japan and the Netherlands, while reaching number two in Ireland, Norway and the UK. In 1994, a remix charted at number 36 in the UK. "In the Navy" was the last top 10 hit for the group in the United States.

Background, writing and video
After the enormous commercial success of their 1978 hit "Y.M.C.A." which unexpectedly became the unofficial hymn and powerful advertising tool for the YMCA, the group took on another national institution, the United States Navy. The Navy contacted group manager Henri Belolo to use the song in a recruiting advertising campaign for television and radio. Belolo gave the rights for free on the condition that the Navy help them shoot the music video. Less than a month later, the Village group arrived at Naval Base San Diego where the Navy provided them with access to film on the deck of the berthed frigate USS Reasoner; in the end, the Navy did not use the video, choosing to remain with the traditional "Anchors Aweigh". 

In a landmark ruling in 2012, the United States District Court for the Southern District of California ruled that under the Copyright Act of 1976, co-writer Victor Willis (Village People's "Cop"/"Naval officer") can recover his share of the copyrights to songs co-written by him. Willis now owns 33% of his songs.

Critical reception
According to Billboard Magazine, "In the Navy" is an "upbeat dance effort [which] showcases the group's familiar theme and sound with this comedic spoof on the Navy."  Cash Box said it has "a vibrant beat, powerful horns, sweeping strings and another knock-out campy lyric." Record World called it a "pounding disco number with a chuckle in the lyrics."

Charts

Weekly charts

Year-end charts

Certifications and sales

References

1978 songs
1979 singles
Casablanca Records singles
disco songs
military humor
Oricon International Singles Chart number-one singles
RPM Top Singles number-one singles
song recordings produced by Jacques Morali
songs about sailors
songs about the military
songs written by Jacques Morali
songs written by Victor Willis
Village People songs
works about the United States Navy